Abby Leach (May 28, 1855 – December 29, 1918) was born in  Brockton, Massachusetts. She was an American educator and professor of Greek and Latin at Vassar College in Poughkeepsie, New York from 1883 until December 29, 1918 where she died due to cancer at the age of 63 and was buried in Brockton.

Education and career 
She was one of the first female students at Harvard University, enrolling in a "Plan for Private Collegiate Instruction of Women" upon its establishment in 1879 at her behest. The "Plan" led to the later establishment of Radcliffe College. Because Harvard at that time did not grant degrees to women, Vassar College granted her bachelor's and master's degrees after they appointed her to the Vassar faculty.

She was a member of the Greek Conference of the Committee of Ten called by the National Education Association in 1894, the only female member of any conference of the Committee of Ten.

In 1899, she became the first female president of the American Philological Association. From 1899 to 1901, Leach was president of the Association of Collegiate Alumnae which later became the American Association of University Women.

Early Personal Life 
Abby Leach was one of five children of Marcus and Eliza Paris Bourne Leach. Marcus Leach was an owner of a shoe making business.

She began reading Latin at an early age at Brockton High School. She graduated Brockton at age fourteen in 1869, and attended Oread Institute, where she learned Greek. At the age of sixteen, Leach briefly taught at Brockton High, then went back to Oread, where she taught from 1873-1878.

References

Further reading
National Education Association, Report of the Committee of Ten on Secondary School Studies: with the reports of the conferences arranged by the committee.   New York: American Book Company, 1894.

External links
 

Radcliffe College alumni
Vassar College faculty
Vassar College alumni
American classical scholars
Women classical scholars
1855 births
1918 deaths